Miranda de Arga is a town and municipality located in the province and autonomous community of Navarre, northern Spain.

The prominent 16th century theologian Bartolomé Carranza was born in 1503 at Miranda de Arga, member of a noble family which had its estates there.

References

External links
 MIRANDA DE ARGA in the Bernardo Estornés Lasa - Auñamendi Encyclopedia (Euskomedia Fundazioa) 

Municipalities in Navarre